"Millennium" was a comic book crossover story line that ran through an eight-issue, self-titled, limited series and various other titles cover dated January and February 1988 by DC Comics. The limited series was published weekly, which was a departure for an American series. It was written by Steve Englehart, and with art by Joe Staton and Ian Gibson.

Plot
The story took place at a time when the Guardians of the Universe had left Earth's dimension along with their mates, the Zamarons. However, one Guardian, Herupa Hando Hu, and his Zamaron mate, Nadia Safir, traveled to Earth and announced to the world that they would select 10 persons who would become the new Guardians of the Universe, and give birth to a new race of immortals. They gathered Earth's superheroes and sent them to find the chosen persons, who came from various parts of the world. One of them turned out to be Hal Jordan's friend, Thomas Kalmaku, while another was the former villain known as the Floronic Man.

Manhunters
Unknown to everyone, the robotic cult known as the Manhunters (whom the Justice League believed had been destroyed years before) had found a sphere that Harbinger had used to store all the information she had gathered about the universe after the Crisis on Infinite Earths. Because of it, they knew the secret identities of Earth's heroes, and had planted their agents (including androids, mind-controlled humans and willing human agents) close to them (in other words, many of the supporting characters featured in the heroes' own comic titles were revealed to be Manhunters). On finding out about the search for The Chosen, the Manhunters decided to prevent it, and had their agents reveal themselves and attack Earth’s heroes. The heroes, joined by Harbinger, defeated the Manhunter agents and then attacked their home planet, defeating the cult again.

New Guardians
The Heroes managed to gather most of the Chosen, but two were killed over the course of the series, one (Terra of the Teen Titans) was already dead before it started, and one was senile. Another Chosen, a white supremacist from South Africa named Janwillem Kroef, eventually left the group because it contained non-white members. The Guardian and the Zamaron then died activating the latent powers of the remaining Chosen. They became a new superhero group, The New Guardians, which had its own comic book series afterwards, also by Englehart and Staton. The new series only lasted 12 issues.

The True Chosen
The spirits of Haru and Safir later reappeared and explained that alternate plans had also been put in motion, and that a group of beings created by Kroef would be the true Chosen. The New Guardians later disbanded. The current status of the second Chosen is unknown. The Manhunters are apparently active again.

Tie-in issues
Action Comics #596
Adventures of Superman #436-437
Batman #415
Blue Beetle vol. 6, #20-21
Booster Gold #24-25
Captain Atom vol. 2,  #11
Detective Comics #582
Firestorm the Nuclear Man vol. 2 #67-68
Flash vol. 2 #8-9
Green Lantern Corps #220-221
Infinity, Inc. #46-47
Justice League International #9-10
Legion of Super-Heroes vol. 3 #42-43
The Outsiders #27-28
Secret Origins vol. 2 #22-23
The Spectre vol. 2 #10-11
Suicide Squad #9
Superman vol. 2 #13-14
Teen Titans Spotlight #18-19
Wonder Woman vol. 2 #12-13
Young All-Stars #8-9
Swamp Thing vol. 2 #65-66; an unofficial tie-in with the Millennium-related story of the Floronic Man

References

External links
 Millennium at Mike's Amazing World of DC Comics with scans of covers

Alien invasions in comics
Comics by Steve Englehart
Justice League storylines
Green Lantern storylines